Ana Maria Naimasi (21 February 1994) is a Fijian Olympic bronze medal-winning rugby union player.

Career
Naimasi was named in the Fiji squad for the Rugby sevens at the 2020 Summer Olympics. She won a bronze medal at the event. Going in to the tournament Naimasi had scored 21 international tries.

Naimasi was part of the Fijiana sevens team that won the silver medal at the 2022 Commonwealth Games in Birmingham. She also competed at the Rugby World Cup Sevens in Cape Town. In September she played in a warm up match against Canada. She was also named in the Fijiana squad for the 2021 Rugby World Cup.

References

External links

1994 births
Living people
Fijian rugby union players
Fijian rugby sevens players
Olympic rugby sevens players of Fiji
Rugby sevens players at the 2020 Summer Olympics
Medalists at the 2020 Summer Olympics
Olympic bronze medalists for Fiji
Olympic medalists in rugby sevens
Fiji international women's rugby sevens players
Rugby sevens players at the 2022 Commonwealth Games
Commonwealth Games silver medallists for Fiji
Commonwealth Games medallists in rugby sevens
Medallists at the 2022 Commonwealth Games